Right-wing populism, also called national populism and right-wing nationalism, is a political ideology that combines right-wing politics and populist rhetoric and themes. Its rhetoric employs anti-elitist sentiments, opposition to the Establishment, and speaking to or for the "common people". Recurring themes of right-wing populists include neo-nationalism, social conservatism, economic nationalism and fiscal conservatism. Frequently, they aim to defend a national culture, identity, and economy against perceived attacks by outsiders.

Right-wing populism in the Western world is generally associated with ideologies such as anti-environmentalism, anti-globalization, nativism, and protectionism. In Europe, the term is often used to describe groups, politicians, and political parties generally known for their opposition to immigration, especially from the Muslim world, and for Euroscepticism. Right-wing populists may support expanding the welfare state, but only for those they deem fit to receive it; this concept has been referred to as "welfare chauvinism".

From the 1990s, right-wing populist parties became established in the legislatures of various democracies. Although extreme right-wing movements in the United States (where they are normally referred to as the "radical right") are usually characterized as separate entities, some writers consider them to be a part of a broader, right-wing populist phenomenon.

Since the Great Recession, European right-wing populist movements such as Brothers of Italy, the National Rally (formerly the National Front) in France, the Party for Freedom and the Forum for Democracy in the Netherlands, the Finns Party, the Sweden Democrats, Danish People's Party, the Freedom Party of Austria, the UK Independence Party and the Brexit Party began to grow in popularity, in large part due to increasing opposition to immigration from the Middle East and Africa, rising Euroscepticism and discontent with the economic policies of the European Union. American businessman and media personality Donald Trump won the 2016 United States presidential election after running on a platform that included right-wing populist themes.

Definition 
Right-wing populism is an ideology that primarily espouses neo-nationalism, social conservatism, and economic nationalism.

Cas Mudde argues that two definitions can be given of the "populist radical right": a maximum and a minimum one, with the "maximum" group being a subgroup of the "minimum" group. The minimum definition describes what Michael Freeden has called the "core concept" of the right-wing populist ideology, the concept shared by all parties generally included in the family. Looking at the primary literature, Mudde concludes that the core concept of right-populism "is undoubtedly the "nation". "This concept", he explains, "also certainly functions as a "coat-hanger" for most other ideological features. Consequently, the minimum definition of the party family should be based on the key concept, the nation". He however rejects the use of "nationalism" as a "core ideology" of right-wing populism on the ground that there are also purely "civic" or "liberal" forms of nationalism, preferring instead the term "nativism": a xenophobic form of nationalism asserting that "states should be inhabited exclusively by members of the native group ("the nation"), and that non-native elements (persons and ideas) are fundamentally threatening to the homogeneous nation-state". Mudde further argues that "while nativism could include racist arguments, it can also be non-racist (including and excluding on the basis of culture or even religion)", and that the term nativism does not reduce the parties to mere single-issue parties, such as the term "anti-immigrant" does. In the maximum definition, to nativism is added authoritarianism—an attitude, not necessary anti-democratic or automatic, to prefer "law and order" and the submission to authority—and populism—a "thin-centered ideology that considers society to be ultimately separated into two homogeneous and antagonistic groups, "the pure people" versus "the corrupt elite", and which argues that politics should be an expression of the "general will of the people", if needed before human rights or constitutional guarantees. Cas Mudde and Cristóbal Rovira Kaltwasser reiterated in 2017 that within European right-wing populism, there is a "marriage of convenience" of populism based on an "ethnic and chauvinistic definition of the people", authoritarianism, and nativism. This results in right-wing populism having a "xenophobic nature."
	
Roger Eatwell, Emeritus Professor of Comparative Politics at the University of Bath, writes that "whilst populism and fascism differ notably ideologically, in practice the latter has borrowed aspects of populist discourse and style, and populism can degenerate into leader-oriented authoritarian and exclusionary politics." For populism to transition into fascism or proto-fascism, it requires a "nihilistic culture and an intractable crisis."

[P]opulism is like fascism in being a response to liberal and socialist explanations of the political. And also like fascism, populism does not recognize a legitimate political place for an opposition that it regards as acting against the desires of the people and that it also accuses of being tyrannical, conspiratorial, and antidemocratic. ... The opponents are turned into public enemies, but only rhetorically. If populism moves from rhetorical enmity to practices of enemy identification and persecution, we could be talking about its transformation into fascism or another form of dictatorial repression. This has happened in the past ... and without question it could happen in the future. This morphing of populism back into fascism is always a possibility, but it is very uncommon, and when it does happen, and populism becomes fully antidemocratic, it is no longer populism.

In summary, Erik Berggren and Andres Neergard wrote in 2015 that "[m]ost researchers agree [...] that xenophobia, anti-immigration sentiments, nativism, ethno-nationalism are, in different ways, central elements in the ideologies, politics, and practices of right-wing populism and Extreme Right Wing Parties." Similarly, historian Rick Shenkman describes the ideology presented by right-wing populism as "a deadly mix of xenophobia, racism, and authoritarianism." Tamir Bar-On also concluded in 2018 that the literature generally places "nativism" or "ethnic nationalism" as the core concept of the ideology, which "implicitly posits a politically dominant group, while minorities are conceived as threats to the nation". It is "generally, but not necessarily racist"; in the case of the Dutch PVV for instance, "a religious [minority, i.e. Muslims] instead of an ethnic minority constitutes the main 'enemy'".

Scholars use terminology inconsistently, sometimes referring to right-wing populism as "radical right" or other terms such as new nationalism. Pippa Norris noted that "standard reference works use alternate typologies and diverse labels categorising parties as 'far' or 'extreme' right, 'New Right', 'anti-immigrant' or 'neofascist', 'antiestablishment', 'national populist', 'protest', 'ethnic', 'authoritarian', 'antigovernment', 'antiparty', 'ultranationalist', 'right-libertarian' and so on".

Political scientist and professor Matthew Goodwin has argued some academic scholars and media commentators conflate national-populism with historic fascist and neo-Nazi movements. In his studies of populist campaigns and parties, Goodwin argues there is a strong distinction between fascism (promoting antisemitism, ethnic purity, anti-capitalism and abolition of democracy) in pre and post-war twentieth century Europe and modern national-populism. He writes that while a visible but small percentage of voters for populist parties hold prejudiced or ethnically defined conceptions of the nation state, many Western European national-populist parties explicitly reject fascist and hardline ethnic nationalism. Goodwin notes that national-populism tends to promote reactionary over revolutionary principles, tolerates a degree of diversity while calling for immigration curbs and opposition to multiculturalism, and presents itself as defending democracy and promoting direct democracy against the European Union or what populists argue are self-serving or corrupt elites. Goodwin also argues that within Western political systems, growing exclusion bias between smaller but more influential social and political classes favouring globally cosmopolitan and liberalized immigration policies suiting graduates and high-income earners and excluded blue collar voters with a stronger attachment to community or national identity has fueled the rise of national-populist parties.

Motivations and methods 
To Roger Eatwell and Matthew Goodwin, "national populists prioritize the culture and interests of the nation, and promise to give voice to a people who feel that they have been neglected, even held in contempt, by distant and often corrupt elites." They are part, Eatwell and Goodwin follow, of a "growing revolt against mainstream politics and liberal values. This challenge is in general not anti-democratic. Rather, national populists are opposed to certain aspects of liberal democracy as it has evolved in the West. [...] [Their] "direct" conception of democracy differs from the "liberal" one that has flourished across the West following the defeat of fascism and which has gradually become more elitist in character." Furthermore, national populists question what they call the "erosion of the nation-state", "hyper ethnic change" and the "capacity to rapidly absorb [high] rates of immigration", the "highly unequal societies" of the West's current economic settlement. They are suspicious of "cosmopolitan and globalizing agendas". Populist parties use crises in their domestic governments to enhance anti-globalist reactions; these include refrainment towards trade and anti-immigration policies. The support for these ideologies commonly comes from people whose employment might have low occupational mobility. This makes them more likely to develop an anti-immigrant and anti-globalization mentality that aligns with the ideals of the populist party.

Jean-Yves Camus and Nicolas Lebourg see "national populism" as an attempt to combine the socio-economical values of the left and political values of the right and the support for a referendary republic that would bypass traditional political divisions and institutions as they aim for the unity of the political (the demos), ethnic (the ethnos) and social (the working class) interpretations of the "people", national populists claim to defend the "average citizen" and "common sense", against the "betrayal of inevitably corrupt elites". As Front National ideologue François Duprat put in the 1970s, inspired by the Latin American right of that time, right-populism aims to constitute a "national, social, and popular" ideology. If both left and right parties share populism itself, their premises are indeed different in that right-wing populists perceive society as in a state of decadence, from which "only the healthy common people can free the nation by forming one national class from the different social classes and casting aside the corrupt elites".

Methodologically, by co-opting concepts from the left – such as multiculturalism and ethnopluralism, which is espoused by the left as a means of preserving minority ethnic cultures within a pluralistic society – and then jettisoning their non-hierarchical essence, right-wing populists can, in the words of sociologist Jens Rydgren, "mobilize on xenophobic and racist public opinions without being stigmatized as racists." Sociologist Hande Eslen-Ziya argues that right-wing populist movements rely on "troll science," namely "(distorted) scientific arguments moulded into populist discourse" that creates an alternative narrative.

History

Europe 
European right-wing populism can be traced back to the period 1870–1900 in the aftermath of the Franco-Prussian War, with the nascence of two different trends in Germany and France: the Völkisch movement and Boulangism. Völkischen represented a romantic nationalist, racialist, and from the 1900s, antisemitic tendency in German society, as they idealized a bio-mystical "original nation" that still could be found in their views in the rural regions, a form of "primitive democracy freely subjected to their natural elites". In France, the anti-parliamentarian Ligue des Patriotes, led by Boulanger, Déroulède, and Barrès, called for a "plebiscitary republic", with the president elected by universal suffrage, and the popular will expressed not through elected representatives (the "corrupted elites"), but rather via "legislative plebiscites", another name for referendums. It also evolved to antisemitism after the Dreyfus affair (1894).

Modern national populism—what Pierro Ignazi called "post-industrial parties"—emerged in the 1970s, in a dynamic sustained by voters' rejection of the welfare state and of the tax system, both deemed "confiscatory"; the rise of xenophobia against the backdrop of immigration which, because originating from outside Europe, was considered to be of a new kind; and finally, the end of the prosperity that had reigned since the post–World War II era, symbolized by the oil crisis of 1973. Two precursor parties consequently appeared in the early 1970s: the Progress Party, the ancestor of the Danish People's Party, and Anders Lange's Party in Norway.

A new wave of right-wing populism arose after the September 11 attacks. "Neo-populists" are nationalist and Islamophobic politicians who aspire "to be the champions of freedoms for minorities (gays, Jews, women) against the Arab-Muslim masses"; a trend first embodied by the Dutch Pim Fortuyn List and later followed by Geert Wilders' Party for Freedom and Marine Le Pen's National Rally. According to Jean-Yves Camus and Nicolas Lebourg, those parties are not a real syncretism of the left and right, as their ideology and voter base are interclassist. Furthermore, neo-populist parties went from a critique of the welfare state to that of multiculturalism, and their priority demand remains the reduction of immigration.

Matthew Goodwin has argued that the growth of European right-wing populist parties has sometimes depended on the country or region they have been founded in and the debates within those countries. He notes a majority of voters in certain European nations such as Spain, Germany, Italy and Sweden initially had an aversion to nationalist forces in the twentieth century due to their political histories concerning the Second World War, being previously ruled by dictators, having codes of neutrality or maintaining better economic stability compared to other countries. However, populist parties in these countries that have been founded since the turn of the twentieth century or have moderated themselves from previously radical ideology have performed well in elections due to not having past stigma associated with fascist and antisemitic beliefs and due to these nations experiencing a faster influx of non-Western migration in recent years. He writes populist parties in these nations have mobilized on debates surrounding immigration, Islam, crime, terrorism and social exclusion, and that exclusion bias within policy-making tended to ignore or dismiss concerns expressed by voters on matters to do with immigration. Goodwin has also opined that political commentators have misjudged voters' support for populist movements as solely related to economic climates and not cultural issues and that right-wing populists have scored ideological victories by pressuring mainstream parties into adopting similar policies to win back voters.

Contemporary movements by country
Piero Ignazi divided right-wing populist parties, which he called "extreme right parties", into two categories: he placed traditional right-wing parties that had developed out of the historical right and post-industrial parties that had developed independently. He placed the British National Party, the National Democratic Party of Germany, the German People's Union, and the former Dutch Centre Party in the first category, whose prototype would be the disbanded Italian Social Movement. In contrast, he placed the French National Front, the German Republicans, the Dutch Centre Democrats, the former Belgian Vlaams Blok (which would include certain aspects of traditional extreme right parties), the Danish Progress Party, the Norwegian Progress Party and the Freedom Party of Austria in the second category.

Right-wing populist parties in the English-speaking world include the UK Independence Party and Australia's One Nation. The U.S. Republican Party and the Conservative Party of Canada include right-wing populist factions.

Americas

Brazil

In Brazil, right-wing populism began to rise roughly around the time Dilma Rousseff won the 2014 presidential election. In the Brazilian general election of 2014, Levy Fidelix, from the Brazilian Labour Renewal Party, presented himself with a conservative speech and, according to him, the only right-wing candidate. He spoke for traditional family values and opposed abortion, legalization of marijuana, and same-sex marriage and proposed that homosexual individuals be treated far away from the good citizens' and workers' families. In the first round of the general election, Fidelix received 446,878 votes, representing 0.43% of the popular vote. Fidelix ranked 7th out of 11 candidates. In the second round, Fidelix supported candidate Aécio Neves.

In addition, according to the political analyst of the Inter-Union Department of Parliamentary Advice, Antônio Augusto de Queiroz, the National Congress elected in 2014 may be considered the most conservative since the "re-democratization" movement, noting an increase in the number of parliamentarians linked to more conservative segments, such as ruralists, the military, the police, and the religious right. The subsequent economic crisis of 2015 and investigations of corruption scandals led to a right-wing movement that sought to rescue fiscally and socially conservative ideas in opposition to the left-wing policies of the Workers' Party. At the same time, right-libertarians, such as those that make up the Free Brazil Movement, emerged among many others. For Manheim (1952), within a single real generation, there may be several generations which he called "differentiated and antagonistic". For him, it is not the common birth date that marks a generation, though it matters, but rather the historical moment in which they live in common. In this case, the historical moment was the impeachment of Dilma Rousseff. They can be called the "post-Dilma generation".

Centrist interim President Michel Temer took office following the impeachment of President Rousseff. Temer held 3% approval ratings in October 2017, facing a corruption scandal after accusations of obstructing justice and racketeering against him. He managed to avoid trial thanks to the support of the right-wing parties in the Brazilian Congress. On the other hand, President of the Senate Renan Calheiros, acknowledged as one of the key figures behind Rousseff's destitution and a member of the centrist Brazilian Democratic Movement Party, was removed from office after facing embezzlement charges.

In March 2016, after entering the Social Christian Party, far-right congressman Jair Bolsonaro decided to run for President of the Republic. In 2017, he tried to become the presidential nominee of Patriota, but, eventually, Bolsonaro entered the Social Liberal Party and, supported by the Brazilian Labour Renewal Party, he won the 2018 presidential election, followed by left-wing former Mayor of São Paulo Fernando Haddad of Luiz Inácio Lula da Silva's Workers' Party. Lula was banned from running after being convicted on criminal corruption charges and imprisoned. Bolsonaro has been accused of racist, xenophobic, misogynistic, and homophobic rhetoric. His campaign was centered on opposition to crime, political corruption, and LGBT identity, and support for tax cuts, militarism, Catholicism, and Evangelicalism.

Canada
Canada has a history of right-wing populist protest parties and politicians, most notably in Western Canada, partly due to the idea of Western alienation. The highly successful Social Credit Party of Canada consistently won seats in British Columbia, Alberta, and Saskatchewan but fell into obscurity by the 1970s.

In the late 1980s, the Reform Party of Canada, led by Preston Manning, became another right-wing populist movement formed due to the policies of the center-right Progressive Conservative Party of Canada, which alienated many Blue Tories and led to a feeling of neglect in the West of Canada. Initially motivated by a single-issue desire to give a voice to Western Canada, the Reform Party expanded its platform to include a blend of socially conservative and right-wing populist policies. It grew from a fringe party into a major political force in the 1990s and became the official opposition party before reforming itself as the Canadian Alliance. The Alliance ultimately merged with the Progressive Conservative Party to form the modern-day Conservative Party of Canada, after which the Alliance faction dropped some of its populist and socially conservative ideas.

In recent years, right-wing populist elements have existed within the Conservative Party of Canada and mainstream provincial parties and have most notably been espoused by Ontario MP Kellie Leitch; businessman Kevin O'Leary; Quebec Premier François Legault; the former Mayor of Toronto Rob Ford; and his brother, Ontario Premier Doug Ford.

In August 2018, Conservative MP Maxime Bernier left the party, and the following month he founded the People's Party of Canada, which has self-described as "smart populism" and been described as a "right of centre, populist" movement. Bernier lost his seat in the 2019 Canadian elections, and the People's Party scored just above 1% of the vote; however, in the 2021 election, it saw improved performance and climbed to nearly 5% of the popular vote.

Pierre Poilievre, who has been described as populist by some journalists, won the 2022 Conservative Party of Canada leadership election and became the leader of both the Conservative Party and the Official Opposition. Some journalists have compared Poilievre to American Republican populists such as Ted Cruz, however many journalists have dismissed these comparisons due to Poilievre's pro-choice, pro-immigration, and pro-same-sex-marriage positions.

Costa Rica

In the 2018 political campaign, both Evangelical Christian candidate Fabricio Alvarado and right-wing anti-establishment candidate Juan Diego Castro were described as examples of right-wing populists.

United States

Early antecedents of right-wing populism in the United States during the 19th century include the Anti-Masonic and Know-Nothing Parties. The Populist Party (which existed in the 1890s) was a primarily left-wing populist movement.

Moore (1996) argues that "populist opposition to the growing power of political, economic, and cultural elites" helped shape "conservative and right-wing movements" since the 1920s. Historical right-wing populist figures in both major parties in the United States have included Thomas E. Watson, Strom Thurmond, Joe McCarthy, Barry Goldwater, George Wallace, and Pat Buchanan.

In 2010, Rasmussen and Schoen characterized the Tea Party movement as "a right-wing anti-systemic populist movement". They added: "Today our country is in the midst of a...new populist revolt that has emerged overwhelmingly from the right – manifesting itself as the Tea Party movement". In 2010, David Barstow wrote in The New York Times: "The Tea Party movement has become a platform for conservative populist discontent". Some political figures closely associated with the Tea Party, such as U.S. Senator Ted Cruz and former U.S. Representative Ron Paul, have been described as appealing to right-wing populism. In the U.S. House of Representatives, the Freedom Caucus, associated with the Tea Party movement, has been described as right-wing populist.

Donald Trump's 2016 presidential campaign, noted for its anti-establishment, anti-immigration, and anti-free trade rhetoric, was characterized as right-wing populist. The ideology of Trump's former Chief Strategist, Steve Bannon, has also been described as such.

Asia-Pacific countries

Australia

Australia's main right-wing populist party is One Nation, led by Pauline Hanson, Senator for Queensland. One Nation typically supports the opposition Coalition.

Other parties formerly represented in the Australian Parliament with right-wing populist elements and rhetoric include the Australian Conservatives, led by Cory Bernardi, Senator for South Australia; David Leyonhjelm, Senator for New South Wales; and Katter's Australian Party, led by Queensland MP Bob Katter.

Some figures within the Coalition have been described as right-wing populists, including former Prime Minister Tony Abbott and Opposition Leader Peter Dutton.

	
In the Australian state of Victoria, The main opposition party Liberal Victoria and its leader Matthew Guy have been described by the media for its constant attack on pandemic health measures  and posting irrational attacks on the Andrews Government in the social media account. However, Liberal Victoria still aims to appeal to moderate voters on issues such as climate change and indigenous treaties

Japan 
Netto-uyoku, Zaitokukai, and the Japan First Party are evaluated as similar to Western far-right populism and the alt-right movement.

New Zealand

Pakistan 
In Pakistan, Pakistan Tehreek Insaaf (PTI) has recently been described as centrist-populist while sharing some characteristics with right-wing populists. Its leader Imran Khan has furiously attacked traditional politicians and made people believe that only he has the solutions. British journalist Ben Judah, in an interview, compared Imran Khan with Donald Trump on his populist rhetoric.

South Korea 

Conservatism in South Korea has traditionally been more inclined toward elitism than populism. However, since the 2016 South Korean political scandal, Korean conservative forces have changed their political lines to populism as the distrust of the elite spread among the Korean public.

Hong Joon-pyo and Lee Un-ju of the United Future Party are leading right-wing populists advocating anti-homosexuality, anti-immigration and social conservative views. Yoon Seok-youl, a candidate for the PPP in the 2022 South Korean presidential election, is criticized as a "populist" for using hostile sentiment toward feminism and proposing unrealistic economic policies.

South Korean right-wing circles insist that the impeachment of former President Park Geun-hye is wrong, stimulating conservative public nostalgia for the Park Chung-hee administration. It also shows a radical anti-North Korea, anti-Chinese and anti-communist stance.

Taiwan  
Taiwan's right-wing populists tend to deny the independent identity of their country's 'Taiwan' and emphasize their identity as a 'Republic of China'. Taiwan's left-wing Taiwanese nationalists have strong pro-American tendencies, so Taiwan's major and minor conservatives are critical of this. In particular, Taiwan's right-wing populists demand that economic growth and right-wing Chinese nationalist issues be more important than liberal democracy and that they become closer to the People's Republic of China. Some of Taiwan's leading right-wing populists include Terry Gou, Han Kuo-yu, and Chang Ya-chung.

European countries

Senior European Union diplomats cited growing anxiety in Europe about Russian financial support for far-right and populist movements and told the Financial Times that the intelligence agencies of "several" countries had scrutinized possible links with Moscow. In 2016, the Czech Republic warned that Russia was trying to "divide and conquer" the European Union by supporting right-wing populist politicians across the bloc. However, as there in the United States of America, there seems to be an underlying problem that is not massively discussed in the media. That underlying problem is that of housing. A 2019 study shows an immense correlation between the price of housing and voting for populist parties. In that study, it was revealed that the French citizens that saw the price of their houses stagnate or drop were much more likely to vote for Marine Le Pen in the 2017 French presidential election. Those who saw the price of their house rise were much more likely to vote for Emmanuel Macron. The same pattern emerged in the 2016 United Kingdom European Union membership referendum, in which those that saw the price of their house rise voted to Remain. Whereas those that saw it flatline or drop voted to Leave.

Austria
The Austrian Freedom Party (FPÖ), established in 1955, claims to represent a "Third Camp" (Drittes Lager) beside the Socialist Party and the social Catholic Austrian People's Party. It succeeded the Federation of Independents founded after World War II, adopting the pre-war heritage of German nationalism, although it did not advocate Nazism and placed itself in the political center. Though it did not gain much popularity for decades, it exercised a considerable balance of power by supporting several federal governments, be it right-wing or left-wing, e.g., the Socialist Kreisky cabinet of 1970 (see Kreisky–Peter–Wiesenthal affair).

From 1980, the Freedom Party adopted a more moderate stance. Upon the 1983 federal election, it entered a coalition government with the Socialist Party, whereby party chairman Norbert Steger served as Vice-Chancellor. The liberal interlude, however, ended when Jörg Haider was elected chairman in 1986. Haider re-integrated the party's nationalist base voters through his down-to-earth manners and patriotic attitude. Nevertheless, he also obtained votes from large sections of the population disenchanted with politics by publicly denouncing the corruption and nepotism of the Austrian Proporz system. The electoral success was boosted by Austria's accession to the European Union in 1995.

Upon the 1999 federal election, the Freedom Party (FPÖ), with 26.9% of the votes cast, became the second strongest party in the National Council parliament. Having entered a coalition government with the People's Party, Haider had to face the disability of several FPÖ ministers and the impossibility of agitation against members of his cabinet. In 2005, he finally countered the FPÖ's loss of reputation with the Alliance for the Future of Austria (BZÖ) relaunch to carry on his government. The remaining FPÖ members elected Heinz-Christian Strache chairman, but since the 2006 federal election, both right-wing parties have run separately. After Haider was killed in a car accident in 2008, the BZÖ lost a measurable amount of support.

The FPÖ regained much of its support in subsequent elections. Its candidate Norbert Hofer made it into the runoff in the 2016 presidential election, though he narrowly lost the election. After the 2017 legislative elections, the FPÖ formed a government coalition with the Austrian People's Party but lost seats in 2019.

Belgium

Vlaams Blok, established in 1978, operated on a platform of law and order, anti-immigration (with a particular focus on Islamic immigration), and secession of the Flanders region of the country. The secession was originally planned to end in the annexation of Flanders by the culturally and linguistically similar Netherlands until the plan was abandoned due to the multiculturalism in that country. In the elections to the Flemish Parliament in June 2004, the party received 24.2% of the vote, within less than 2% of being the largest party. However, in November of the same year, the party was ruled illegal under the country's anti-racism law for, among other things, advocating segregated schools for citizens and immigrants.

In less than a week, the party was re-established under the name Vlaams Belang, initially with a near-identical ideology before moderating parts of its statute. It advocates the adoption of the Flemish culture and language by immigrants who wish to stay in the country. It also calls for a zero-tolerance stance on illegal immigration and the reinstatement of border controls. Despite some accusations of antisemitism from Belgium's Jewish population, the party has demonstrated a staunch pro-Israel stance as part of its opposition to Islam. In Antwerp, sections of the city's significant Jewish population have begun to support the party. With 23 of 124 seats, Vlaams Belang leads the opposition in the Flemish Parliament and holds 11 out of the 150 seats in the Belgian House of Representatives.

The Flemish nationalist and conservative liberal N-VA party has been described as populist or containing right-wing populist elements by foreign media such as the German Die Zeit magazine. However, the party has rebutted the term and does not label itself as such.

In the French-speaking Walloon region, Mischaël Modrikamen, an associate of Steve Bannon, was chairman of the Parti Populaire (PP), which contested elections in Wallonia. Political analysts have generally observed that right-wing populist parties tend to perform better with the Flemish electorate over French-speaking Belgian voters, on the whole, owing to the Flemish vote moving to the right in recent decades and Flemish parties intertwining Flemish nationalism with other issues.

As of the 2019 federal, regional, and European elections, Vlaams Belang (VB) has surged from 248,843 votes in 2014 to 783,977 on 26 May 2019.

Bulgaria

There are several right-wing populist parties in Bulgaria, including IMRO-BNM, National Front for the Salvation of Bulgaria, and Attack. For the 2017 Bulgarian parliamentary election, they formed the United Patriots electoral alliance, which won 27 seats in Parliament. United Patriots entered a coalition with GERB to form the Third Borisov Government. Volya, another right-wing populist party with 12 seats in Parliament, also supported the government.

Following the 2021 Bulgarian general election, another right-wing populist party, Revival, entered Parliament, while IMRO-BNM, NFSB, Attack, and Volya failed to win any seats.

Cyprus

The ELAM was formed in 2008. Its platform includes advocating for Unification with Greece, opposition to further European integration, immigration, and the status quo that remains due to Turkey's invasion of a third of the island (and the international community's lack of intention to solve the issue).

Denmark

In the early 1970s, the home of the strongest right-wing populist party in Europe was in Denmark, the Progress Party. In the 1973 election, it received almost 16% of the vote. In the following years, its support dwindled, but the Danish People's Party replaced it in the 1990s becoming an important support party for the governing coalition in the 2000s. It won 37 seats in the 2015 Danish general election and became the second-largest party in Denmark and served as external support from two minority governments during which it was the largest and most influential right-wing populist party in Denmark until it was reduced to 16 seats in 2019 and 5 in 2022. The Danish People's Party advocates immigration reductions, particularly from non-Western countries, favors cultural assimilation of first-generation migrants into Danish society, and is opposed to Denmark becoming a multicultural society.

Additionally, the Danish People's Party's stated goals are to enforce a strict rule of law, maintain a strong welfare system for those in need, promote economic growth by strengthening education and encouraging people to work, and protect the environment. In 2015 the Nye Borgerlige party was founded and gained six seats at the 2022 election. Furthermore the Denmark Democrats were founded in 2022 gaining 16 seats at the election that year.

Finland
In Finland, the main right-wing party is the Finns Party. It formed the government coalition with National Coalition and Centre-Party after the 2015 parliamentary election. In 2017 the governmental branch broke off to form the Blue Reform, which took the coalition position from the Finns Party. Blue Reform is currently in the government coalition, and the Finns Party is in opposition and is the fastest-growing party in Finland. In 2018 a Finnish member of the parliament, Paavo Väyrynen, formed the Seven Star Movement. The party is anti-immigration but is in the center in economic politics.

France

Gaullism is considered part of (right-wing) populism because it is based on charisma, popular mobilization, French nationalism, and exceptionalism. Gaullism is deeply embedded in modern right-wing politics in France.

France's National Front (NF) – renamed in 2018 as the "National Rally" – has been cited as the "prototypical populist radical right-wing party". The party was founded in 1972 by Jean-Marie Le Pen as the unification of several French nationalist movements of the time; he developed it into a well-organized party.  After struggling for a decade, the party reached its first peak in 1984. By 2002, Le Pen received more votes than the Socialist candidate in the first round of voting for the French presidency, becoming the first NF candidate to qualify for a presidential runoff election. After Le Pen's daughter, Marine Le Pen, took over as the head of the party in 2011, the National Front established itself as one of the main political parties in France. Marine Le Pen's policy of "de-demonizing" or normalizing the party resulted in her father, Jean-Marie Le Pen, being first suspended and then ejected from the party in 2015. Marine Le Pen finished second in the 2017 election and lost in the second round of voting versus Emmanuel Macron, which was held on 7 May 2017. However, polls published in 2018 showed that a majority of the French population considers the party to be a threat to democracy.

Hungary

The 2018 Hungarian parliamentary election result was a victory for the Fidesz–KDNP alliance, preserving its two-thirds majority, with Viktor Orbán remaining Prime Minister. Orbán and Fidesz campaigned primarily on the issues of immigration and foreign meddling, and the election was seen as a victory for right-wing populism in Europe.

Germany

Since 2013, the most popular right-wing populist party in Germany has been Alternative for Germany, which managed to finish third in the 2017 German federal election, making it the first right-wing populist party to enter the Bundestag, Germany's national parliament. Before, right-wing populist parties had gained seats in German State Parliaments only. Left-wing populism is represented in the Bundestag by The Left party.

Right-wing populist movements like Pro NRW and Citizens in Rage (Bürger in Wut, BIW) sporadically attract some support. In 1989, The Republicans (Die Republikaner), led by Franz Schönhuber, entered the Abgeordnetenhaus of Berlin and achieved more than 7% of the German votes cast in the 1989 European election, with six seats in the European Parliament. The party also won seats in the Landtag of Baden-Württemberg twice in 1992 and 1996. However, after 2000 the Republicans' support eroded in favor of the far-right German People's Union and the Neo-Nazi National Democratic Party of Germany (NPD), which in the 2009 federal election held 1.5% of the popular vote (winning up to 9% in regional Landtag parliamentary elections).

In 2005, a nationwide Pro Germany Citizens' Movement (pro Deutschland) was founded in Cologne. The Pro Germany movement appears as a conglomerate of numerous small parties, voters' associations, and societies, distinguishing themselves by campaigns against extremism and immigrants. Its representatives claim a zero-tolerance policy and combat corruption. Their politics extend to far-right positions with the denial of a multiethnic society (Überfremdung) and Islamization. Other minor right-wing populist parties include the German Freedom Party, founded in 2010, the former East German German Social Union (DSU), and the dissolved Party for a Rule of Law Offensive ("Schill party").

Greece

The most prominent right-wing populist party in Greece is the Independent Greeks (ANEL). Despite being smaller than the more extreme Golden Dawn party, after the January 2015 legislative elections, ANEL formed a governing coalition with the left-wing Coalition of the Radical Left (SYRIZA), thus making the party a governing party and giving it a place in the Cabinet of Alexis Tsipras.

The Golden Dawn has grown significantly in Greece during the economic downturn, gaining 7% of the vote and 18 out of 300 seats in the Hellenic Parliament. The party's ideology includes annexing territory in Albania and Turkey, including the Turkish cities of Istanbul and Izmir. Controversial measures by the party included a poor people's kitchen in Athens, which only supplied Greek citizens and was shut down by the police.

The Popular Orthodox Rally is not represented in the Greek legislature but supplied 2 of the country's 22 MEPS until 2014. It supports anti-globalization, lower taxes for small businesses, and opposition to Turkish accession to the European Union and the Republic of Macedonia's use of the name Macedonia and immigration only for Europeans. Its participation in government has been one of the reasons why it became unpopular with its voters who turned to Golden Dawn in Greece's 2012 elections.

Italy

In Italy, the most prominent right-wing populist party in the last twenty years was Lega, formerly Lega Nord (Northern League), whose leaders reject the right-wing label, though not the "populist" one. The League is a federalist, regionalist, and sometimes secessionist party, founded in 1991 as a federation of several regional parties of Northern and Central Italy, most of which had arisen and expanded during the 1980s. LN's program advocates the transformation of Italy into a federal state, fiscal federalism, and greater regional autonomy, especially for the Northern regions. At times, the party has advocated for the secession of the North, which it calls Padania. The party generally takes an anti-Southern Italian stance as members are known for opposing Southern Italian emigration to Northern Italian cities, stereotyping Southern Italians as welfare abusers and detrimental to Italian society, and attributing Italy's economic troubles and the disparity of the North–south divide in the Italian economy to supposed inherent negative characteristics of the Southern Italians, such as laziness, lack of education, or criminality. Certain LN members have been known to publicly deploy the offensive slur "terrone", a common pejorative term for Southern Italians evocative of negative Southern Italian stereotypes. As a federalist, regionalist, populist party of the North, LN is also highly critical of the centralized power and political importance of Rome, sometimes adopting to a lesser extent an anti-Roman stance in addition to an anti-Southern stance.

With the rise of immigration into Italy since the late 1990s, LN has increasingly turned its attention to criticizing mass immigration to Italy. The LN, which also opposes illegal immigration, is critical of Islam and proposes Italy's exit from the Eurozone and is considered a Eurosceptic movement and, as such, is a part of the Identity and Democracy(ID) group in the European Parliament. LN was or is part of the national government in 1994, 2001–2006, 2008–2011, and 2018–2019. Most recently, the party, including among its members the Presidents of Lombardy and Veneto, won 17.4% of the vote in the 2018 general election, becoming the third-largest party in Italy (largest within the centre-right coalition). In the 2014 European election, under the leadership of Matteo Salvini, it took 6.2% of votes. Under Salvini, the party has, to some extent, embraced Italian nationalism and emphasized Euroscepticism, opposition to immigration, and other "populist" policies while allying with right-wing populist parties in Europe.

Silvio Berlusconi, leader of Forza Italia and Prime Minister of Italy from 1994 to 1995, 2001–2006, and 2008–2011, has sometimes been described as a right-wing populist, although his party is not typically described as such.

Between the late 2010s and the early 2020s, another right-wing populist movement emerged within the centre-right coalition. The nationalist and national-conservative Brothers of Italy (FdI), led by Giorgia Meloni, gained 4.4% of votes in the 2018 election and, four years later, it became the most voted party in the 2022 general election, gaining 26% of votes. Meloni was appointed Prime Minister on 22 October, at the head of what it was considered as the most rightist Italian government since 1945.

Some national conservative, nationalist, and arguably right-wing populist parties are strong, especially in Lazio, the region around Rome, and Southern Italy. Most of them originated due to the Italian Social Movement (a national-conservative party whose best result was 8.7% of the vote in the 1972 general election) and its successor National Alliance (which reached 15.7% of the vote in the 1996 general election). In addition to Brothers of Italy, they include New Force (0.3%), CasaPound (0.1%), Tricolour Flame (0.1%), Social Idea Movement (0.01%) and Progetto Nazionale (0.01%).

Additionally, in the German-speaking South Tyrol, the local second-largest party, Die Freiheitlichen, is often described as a right-wing populist party.

Netherlands

In the Netherlands, right-wing populism was represented in the 150-seat House of Representatives in 1982 when the Centre Party won a single seat. During the 1990s, a splinter party, the Centre Democrats, was slightly more successful, although its significance was still marginal. Not before 2002 did a right-wing populist party break through in the Netherlands, when the Pim Fortuyn List (LPF) won 26 seats and subsequently formed a coalition with the Christian Democratic Appeal (CDA) and People's Party for Freedom and Democracy (VVD). Fortuyn, who had strong views against immigration, particularly by Muslims, was assassinated in May 2002, two weeks before the election. Ideologically, the LPF differed somewhat from other European right-wing populist movements by holding more liberal stances on certain social issues such as abortion, gay rights, and euthanasia (Fortuyn himself was openly gay) while maintaining an uncompromising stance on immigration, law and order, and the European Union. Fortuyn was also credited with shifting the Dutch political landscape by bringing the topics of multiculturalism, immigration, and the integration of immigrants into the political mainstream. However, the coalition had broken up by 2003, and the LPF went into steep decline until it was dissolved.

Since 2006, the Party for Freedom (PVV) has been represented in the House of Representatives and described as inheriting the mantle of the Pim Fortuyn List. Following the 2010 general election, it has been in a pact with the right-wing minority government of CDA and VVD after it won 24 seats in the House of Representatives. The party is Eurosceptic and plays a leading role in the changing stance of the Dutch government towards European integration as they came second in the 2009 European Parliament election, winning 4 out of 25 seats. The party's main program revolves around strong criticism of Islam, restrictions on migration from new European Union countries and Islamic countries, pushing for cultural assimilation of migrants into Dutch society, opposing the accession of Turkey to the European Union, advocating for the Netherlands to withdraw from the European Union and advocating for a return to the guilder through ending Dutch usage of the euro.

The PVV withdrew its support for the First Rutte cabinet in 2012 after refusing to support austerity measures. This triggered the 2012 general election in which the PVV was reduced to 15 seats and excluded from the new government.

In the 2017 Dutch general election, Wilders' PVV gained an extra five seats to become the second largest party in the Dutch House of Representatives, bringing their total to 20 seats.

From 2017 onwards, the Forum for Democracy (FvD) emerged as another right-wing populist force in the Netherlands. The FvD also advocates a stricter immigration policy and a referendum on Dutch membership of the EU.

Poland

The largest right-wing populist party in Poland is Law and Justice, which currently holds the presidency and a governing majority in the Sejm. It combines social conservatism and criticism of immigration with strong support for NATO and an interventionist economic policy.

Polish Congress of the New Right, headed by Michał Marusik, aggressively promotes fiscally conservative concepts like radical tax reductions preceded by the abolishment of social security, universal public healthcare, state-sponsored education, and Communist Polish 1944 agricultural reform as a way to dynamical economic and welfare growth. The party is considered populist both by right-wing and left-wing publicists.

Romania 
The Alliance for the Union of Romanians (AUR), a right-wing populist party, became the fourth-largest political force in Romania after the 2020 Romanian legislative election.

Spain 

In Spain, the appearance of right-wing populism began to gain strength after the December 2018 election for the Parliament of Andalusia, in which the right-wing populist party VOX managed to obtain 12 seats and agreed to support a coalition government of the parties of the right People's Party and Citizens, even though the Socialist Party won the elections. VOX, which has been frequently described as far-right, both by the left parties and by Spanish or international press, promotes characteristic policies of the populist right, such as the expulsion of all illegal immigrants from the country -even of legal immigrants who commit crimes-, a generalized criminal tightening, combined with traditional claims of right-wing conservatives, such as the centralization of the State and the suppression of the Autonomous Communities, and has harshly criticized the laws against gender violence, approved by the socialist government of José Luis Rodríguez Zapatero, but later maintained by the PP executive of Mariano Rajoy, accusing the people and institutions that defend them of applying "gender totalitarianism".

Party official Javier Ortega Smith is being investigated for alleged hate speech after Spanish prosecutors admitted a complaint by an Islamic association in connection with a rally that talked about “the Islamist invasion”. The party election manifesto that was finally published merged classic far-right-inspired policies with right-libertarianism in tax and social security matters.

After months of political uncertainty and protests against the party in Andalusia and other regions, in the 2019 Spanish general election, VOX managed to obtain 24 deputies in the Congress of Deputies, with 10.26% of the vote, falling short of expectations after an intense electoral campaign in which VOX gathered big crowds of people at their events. Although the People's Party and Citizens leaders, Pablo Casado and Albert Rivera, had admitted repeatedly during the campaign that they would again agree with VOX in order to reach the government, the sum of all their seats finally left them far from any possibility, giving the government to the social democrat Pedro Sánchez.

Sweden
In Sweden, the first openly populist movement to be represented in the Riksdag (Swedish parliament), New Democracy was founded in 1994 by businessman Bert Karlsson and aristocrat Ian Wachtmeister. Although New Democracy promoted economic issues as its foremost concern, it also advocated restrictions on immigration and welfare chauvinism. The party saw a sharp rise in support in 1994 before declining soon after.

In 2010, the Sweden Democrats entered parliament for the first time. The Sweden Democrats originally had connections to white nationalism during its early days but later began expelling hardline members and moderated its platform to transform itself into a more mainstream movement. The party calls for more robust immigration and asylum policies, compulsory measures to assimilate immigrants into Swedish society, and stricter law and order policies. The Sweden Democrats are currently the second largest party in Sweden, with 20.5% of the popular vote in the 2022 Swedish general election, and the second most seats in the Swedish parliament with 73 seats.

Switzerland

In Switzerland, the right-wing populist Swiss People's Party (SVP) reached an all-time high in the 2015 elections. The party is mainly considered national conservative, but it has also variously been identified as "extreme right" and "radical right-wing populist", reflecting a spectrum of ideologies among its members. Its far-right wing includes members such as Ulrich Schlüer and Pascal Junod, who heads a New Right study group and has been linked to Holocaust denial and neo-Nazism.

In Switzerland, radical right populist parties held close to 10% of the popular vote in 1971, were reduced to below 2% by 1979, and grew to more than 10% in 1991. Since 1991, these parties (the Swiss Democrats and the Swiss Freedom Party) have been absorbed by the SVP. During the 1990s, the SVP grew from the fourth largest party to the largest and gained a second seat in the Swiss Federal Council in 2003 with the prominent politician and businessman Christoph Blocher. In 2015, the SVP received 29.4% of the vote, the highest vote ever recorded for a single party throughout Swiss parliamentary history.

Turkey 
The Justice and Development Party (AKP) and its leader Recep Tayyip Erdoğan have been in power since 2002.

The Victory Party is a patriotic and Kemalist political party in Turkey founded on August 26, 2021, under the leadership of Ümit Özdağ. It is represented in the Grand National Assembly of Turkey by two deputies. The party is the continuation of the Ayyıldız Movement initiated by Ümit Özdağ, the founding petition of the party was submitted to the Ministry of the Interior on 26 August 2021, and then the party was officially established. The party leader Özdağ and his deputies aim to re-institute Kemalist and Turkish nationalist ideologies in the government and aim to send back refugees to their homelands.

United Kingdom

Thatcherism, a major conservative ideology in modern Britain, has right-wing populist elements, including nationalism and social conservatism.

Media outlets such as The New York Times have called the UK Independence Party (UKIP), then led by Nigel Farage, the largest right-wing populist party in the United Kingdom. UKIP campaigned for an exit from the European Union prior to the 2016 European membership referendum and a points-based immigration system similar to that used in Australia.

The United Kingdom's governing Conservative Party has seen defections to UKIP over the European Union and immigration debates, as well as LGBT rights.

In the Conservative Party, past prime minister Boris Johnson has been described as expressing right-wing populist views during the successful Vote Leave campaign. Jacob Rees-Mogg, the former Secretary of State for Business, Energy and Industrial Strategy, has also been described as a right-wing populist.

In Northern Ireland, the Democratic Unionist Party (DUP) is the main right-wing populist force.

Right-wing populist political parties

Current right-wing populist parties or parties with right-wing populist factions

Represented in national legislatures

 Australia – Liberal–National Coalition (factions), Pauline Hanson's One Nation, United Australia Party, Katter's Australian Party
 Austria – Freedom Party of Austria, Austrian People's Party (factions) 
 Belgium – Vlaams Belang 
 Brazil – Liberal Party (factions), Patriota, Brazilian Labour Party
 Bulgaria – Revival
 Canada – Conservative Party 
 Chile – Republican Party
 Costa Rica – National Restoration Party, New Republic Party, National Integration Party
 Croatia – Homeland Movement 
 Cyprus – ELAM, Solidarity Movement
 Czech Republic – Freedom and Direct Democracy
 Denmark – Danish People's Party, New Right, Denmark Democrats
 Estonia – Conservative People's Party of Estonia
 European Union – Identity and Democracy Party, European Conservatives and Reformists Party, European People's Party (factions)
 Finland – Finns Party 
 France – National Rally, Debout la France, Reconquête
 Germany – Alternative for Germany
 Greece – Greek Solution, New Democracy (factions)
 Hungary – Fidesz, Our Homeland Movement
 India – Bharatiya Janata Party, Shiv Sena
 Indonesia – Great Indonesia Movement Party, Prosperous Justice Party
 Italy – League, Brothers of Italy, Five Star Movement (factions), Forza Italia (factions)
 Israel – Likud (factions), Yamina, Religious Zionist Party, Otzma Yehudit
 Japan – Liberal Democratic Party, Nippon Ishin no Kai, Kibō no Tō
 Latvia – National Alliance, Who owns the state?, Latvia First, Law and Order
 Liechtenstein – Democrats for Liechtenstein
 Luxembourg – Alternative Democratic Reform Party
 Netherlands – JA21, Party for Freedom, Forum for Democracy
 North Macedonia – VMRO-DPMNE
 Norway – Progress Party
 Paraguay – National Union of Ethical Citizens
 Peru – Popular Force
 Philippines – Nacionalista Party
 Poland – Law and Justice, Confederation (KORWiN, National Movement)
 Portugal – Chega
 Romania – Alliance for the Union of Romanians, Romanian Nationhood Party
 Russia – United Russia, Liberal Democratic Party of Russia, Rodina
 Serbia – United Serbia, Dveri, Serbian People's Party 
 Slovakia – Kotleba – People's Party Our Slovakia, We Are Family, Republic
 Slovenia – Slovenian Democratic Party
 South Africa – Freedom Front Plus
 South Korea - People Power Party
 Spain – Vox
 Sweden – Sweden Democrats
 Switzerland – Swiss People's Party, Geneva Citizens' Movement, Ticino League
 Taiwan - Kuomintang (factions), New party
 Turkey – Justice and Development Party, Nationalist Movement Party, Victory Party (Turkey)
 Ukraine – Svoboda
 United Kingdom – Conservative Party (faction: Blue Collar Conservatives), Democratic Unionist Party
 United States – Republican Party (faction: Freedom Caucus)
 Uruguay – Open Cabildo

Not represented in national legislatures

 Albania – Red and Black Alliance, Albanian National Front Party
 Australia – Shooters, Fishers and Farmers Party, Australian Protectionist Party
 Austria – Alliance for the Future of Austria, Free Party Salzburg
 Belgium – Libertair, Direct, Democratisch, People's Party VLOTT
 Brazil – Alliance for Brazil, Brazilian Labour Renewal Party
 Bulgaria – Bulgaria Without Censorship, National Front for the Salvation of Bulgaria, IMRO – Bulgarian National Movement, Attack, Volya
 Canada – People's Party of Canada, Alliance of the North, National Advancement Party of Canada
 Chile –  National Force
 Croatia – Croatian Party of Rights, Croatian Party of Rights Dr. Ante Starčević, Independents for Croatia
 Czech Republic – Workers' Party of Social Justice, Coalition for Republic – Republican Party of Czechoslovakia
 Denmark – Progress Party, Hard Line
 Finland – Blue and White Front, Seven Star Movement, Blue Reform
 France – Alsace First
 Germany – National Democratic Party of Germany, Citizens' Movement Pro Chemnitz, German Social Union, The Republicans
 Greece – Golden Dawn, National Popular Consciousness, National Party - Hellenes, Popular Orthodox Rally, Independent Greeks
 Iceland – Icelandic National Front
 India – Maharashtra Navnirman Sena, Hindu Mahasabha
 Ireland – National Party, Irish Freedom Party
 Israel – Zehut
 Italy – Tricolour Flame, Die Freiheitlichen, Citizens' Union for South Tyrol, South Tyrolean Freedom
 Liechtenstein – The Independents
 Lithuania – National Alliance, Christian Union, Young Lithuania, Order and Justice
 Malta – Moviment Patrijotti Maltin
 Montenegro – Party of Serb Radicals, True Montenegro, Serb List
 Netherlands – Forza! Nederland
 New Zealand – New Conservative Party, Advance New Zealand, Vision NZ, New Zealand Public Party 
 Poland – Kukiz'15, Congress of the New Right, Real Politics Union
 Portugal – National Renovator Party
 Romania – National Identity Bloc in Europe (Greater Romania Party, United Romania Party, Noua Dreaptă), New Generation Party, M10
 Serbia – Serbian Radical Party, Dveri, Hungarian Hope Movement, Enough is Enough, New Serbia, People's Freedom Movement, Leviathan Movement, Serbian Right, Love, Faith, Hope, Serbian Party Oathkeepers, Healthy Serbia
 Slovakia – Slovak National Party
 South Korea – New Pro-Park Party, Liberty Republican Party, Dawn of Liberty
 Sweden - Alternative for Sweden
 Switzerland – Federal Democratic Union of Switzerland, Freedom Party of Switzerland, Swiss Democrats
 Transnistria – Obnovlenie
 Ukraine – Congress of Ukrainian Nationalists
 United Kingdom – British National Party, For Britain, Brexit Party, Veterans and People's Party, UK Independence Party, Reform UK
 United States – Constitution Party

Former or disbanded right-wing populist parties

 Austria – Team Stronach
 Belgium – National Front, Vlaams Blok, People's Party
 Canada – Union Nationale (Quebec), Ralliement national, Action démocratique du Québec, Reform Party of Canada, Canadian Alliance, Social Credit Party, Wildrose Party (Alberta)
 Cyprus – New Horizons
 Croatia – Croatian Democratic Alliance of Slavonia and Baranja, Croatian Democratic Union (factions)
 Czech Republic – Public Affairs, Dawn - National Coalition
 Denmark – Progress Party
 Germany – Citizens' Movement Pro Cologne, German Freedom Party, German People's Union, Pro Germany Citizens' Movement, Pro NRW, German National People's Party
 European Union – Movement for a Europe of Liberties and Democracy
 Iceland – Citizens' Party
 India - Bharatiya Jana Sangh (Succeeded by Bharatiya Janata Party)
 Italy – National Alliance
 Japan – Japan Restoration Party
 Netherlands – Centre Democrats, Pim Fortuyn List
 Portugal – Portugal Pro-Life
 Serbia – Serbian Patriotic Alliance, Serbian People's Party
 South Korea – Democratic Republican Party, Liberty Korea Party, Onward for Future 4.0
 Spain – Platform for Catalonia
 Sweden – New Democracy
 Switzerland – Party of Farmers, Traders and Independents, Republican Movement
 Syria – Arab Liberation Movement
 United Kingdom – National Democrats

See also

 Alt-right
 Berlusconism
 Brexit
 Counter-Enlightenment
 Christian right
 Criticism of multiculturalism
 Dark Enlightenment
 Economic nationalism
 Fascism
 Gaullism
 Hindutva
 Left-wing nationalism
 Left-wing populism
 National conservatism
 National liberalism
 Nationalism
 Nativism (politics)
 Opposition to immigration
 Paternalistic conservatism
 Putinism
 Protectionism
 Racism
 Reactionary
 Revisionist Zionism
 Right-wing authoritarianism
 Right-wing antiscience
 Right-wing terrorism
 Rashism
 Social conservatism
 Thatcherism
 Traditionalism
 Trumpism
 White backlash
 Xenophobia

References
Informational notes

Citations

Bibliography

Berlet, Chip and Matthew N. Lyons. 2000. Right-Wing Populism in America: Too Close for Comfort. New York: Guilford Press. , .
Betz, Hans-Georg. Radical right-wing populism in Western Europe. New York: Palgrave Macmillan, 1994 .
Betz, Hans-Georg and Immerfall, Stefan. The New Politics of the Right: Neo-Populist Parties and Movements in Established Democracies. Houndsmill, Basingstoke, Hampshire, UK, Macmillan Press Ltd., 1998 ,

Fielitz, Maik; Laloire, Laura Lotte (eds.) (2016). Trouble on the Far Right. Contemporary Right-Wing Strategies and Practices in Europe. Bielefeld: transcript. .
Fritzsche, Peter. 1990. Rehearsals for Fascism: Populism and Political Mobilization in Weimar Germany. New York: Oxford University Press. .

Further reading

Goldwag, Arthur. The New Hate: A History of Fear and Loathing on the Populist Right. Pantheon, February 2012, .

Wodak, Ruth. The politics of fear: What right-wing populist discourses mean. London: Sage, 2015. .
Wodak, Ruth, Brigitte Mral and Majid Khosravinik, editors. Right wing populism in Europe: politics and discourse. London. Bloomsbury Academic. 2013. .

External links

"Fact check: The rise of right-wing populism in Europe". Channel 4 News (UK). 28 September 2017.

 
Populism
Political spectrum
Conservatism
Nationalism
Political terminology
Populism